The Film to Come (French: Le film à venir) is a 1997 French short film directed by Raúl Ruiz. The story concerns a cult that continuously watches a 23-second long film in a neverending loop. The film has no dialogue; instead, an ever-changing narrator gives a first-person account of his experience with the cult.

Plot 
For the last seven years, a group of people who call themselves the Philokinetes have been ritualistically screening a 23-second long fragment of film called "The Film to Come". In the so-called "Room of Clocks," devotees watch the fragment over and over again in order to enter a hypnotic state in which there is no difference between film and reality.

The narrator encounters the Philokinetes in search of his missing daughter, who went missing during a screening. Upon having a vision of his daughter within the pages of the Philokinetes' sacred books, he falls into a deathlike fugue, understanding that he has become a part of the sacred film.

Cast 
 Féodor Atkine (voice)
 Jean-Yves Gauthier (voice)
 Hubert Saint-Macary (voice)
 Gérard Vincent
 Margot Marguerite
 Edouard Waintrop
 Abdelwaheb Meddeb
 Guy Scarpetta
 Bernard Pautrat
 Waldo Rojas

Reception 
Despite its limited release, Le film à venir drew some praise for its application of Ruiz's own theory of "shamanic cinema," in which he articulated the idea that film can be transformative in the same fashion as older forms of orally-transmitted culture.

References

External links 
 The Film to Come at the Internet Movie Database
 Le film à venir on Vimeo

French short films
Films directed by Raúl Ruiz
1997 films
1990s French-language films
1997 short films
1990s French films